ISO 3166-2:AM is the entry for Armenia in ISO 3166-2, part of the ISO 3166 standard published by the International Organization for Standardization (ISO), which defines codes for the names of the principal subdivisions (e.g., provinces or states) of all countries coded in ISO 3166-1.

Currently for Armenia, ISO 3166-2 codes are defined for 1 city and 10 regions. The city Yerevan is the capital of the country and has special status equal to the regions.

Each code consists of two parts, separated by a hyphen. The second part is two letters.

Current codes
Subdivision names are listed as in the ISO 3166-2 standard published by the ISO 3166 Maintenance Agency (ISO 3166/MA).

Click on the button in the header to sort each column.

 Notes

Changes
The following changes to the entry are listed on ISO's online catalogue, the Online Browsing Platform:

See also
 Subdivisions of Armenia
 FIPS region codes of Armenia

External links
 ISO Online Browsing Platform: AM
 Provinces of Armenia, Statoids.com

2:AM
ISO 3166-2
Armenia geography-related lists